The FIBA Americas Championship for Women 2009 is the continental championships held by FIBA Americas for North, Central and South America and the Caribbean. The championship will serve as a qualifying tournament for the 2010 FIBA World Championship for Women in the Czech Republic. The tournament will be held on Ginásio Aecim Tocantins in Cuiabá, Brazil from September 23 to September 27.

Preliminary round

Group A

Group B

Knockout stage

Championship Bracket

5th place bracket

Classification 5–8

Semi finals

Seventh place game

Fifth place game

Third place game

Final

Final standings

External links
 Official Website

FIBA Women's AmeriCup
2009 in women's basketball
2009–10 in Brazilian basketball
International women's basketball competitions hosted by Brazil
2009–10 in North American basketball
2009–10 in South American basketball